Kim Jin-hwan (born 1 March 1989) is a South Korean former football defender.

During his career, he played for Gangwon FC, Incheon United, Gwangju FC, FC Anyang, Sangju Sangmu FC, and Seoul E-Land FC.

Club career
Kim, having spent his youth football career with Kyunghee University, was selected by Gangwon FC from the 2011 K-League draft intake.  He made his professional debut in the club's 5 - 0 win over Gwangju FC in the first round match of the 2011 K-League Cup.

On 20th December 2022, he has retired and started his career as a manager of U-12 team of Seoul E-Land FC.

Club career statistics

References

External links

1989 births
Living people
South Korean footballers
Gangwon FC players
Incheon United FC players
Gwangju FC players
FC Anyang players
Gimcheon Sangmu FC players
Seoul E-Land FC players
K League 1 players
K League 2 players
Association football defenders